State Road 149 (SR 149) is a part of the Indiana State Road that runs between Valparaiso and Burns Harbor in the US state of Indiana.  The  of SR 149 that lie within Indiana serve as a minor highway. None of the highway is listed on the National Highway System. Various sections of the road are rural two-lane and urban four-lane undivided highways, passing through farmland and residential properties.

Route description
SR 149 begins at an intersection with SR 130, just north of the Chicago Fort Wayne and Eastern Railroad and Norfolk Southern Railroad tracks. The road heads north as a two-lane highway, passing through rural farmland with some houses. The highway has traffic lights at U.S. Route 6 (US 6). The route crosses under the Indiana Toll Road and has an at-grade crossing with the CSX Transportation railroad tracks. The road crosses another set of CSX Railroad tracks and has a traffic light at US 20. North of US 20, the highway becomes a four-lane undivided highway, with a wide median. The route crosses over Interstate 94 (I–94). The route curves northwest, becoming a four-lane undivided highway and having an intersection with US 12.

No segment of State Road 149 in Indiana that is included in the National Highway System (NHS).  The NHS is a network of highways that are identified as being most important for the economy, mobility and defense of the nation.  The highway is maintained by the Indiana Department of Transportation (INDOT) like all other state roads in the state. The department tracks the traffic volumes along all state roads as a part of its maintenance responsibilities using a metric called average annual daily traffic (AADT). This measurement is a calculation of the traffic level along a segment of roadway for any average day of the year. In 2010, INDOT figured that lowest traffic levels were 5,299 vehicles and 94 commercial vehicles used the highway daily between US 20 and US 12. The peak traffic volumes were 12,783 vehicles and 491 commercial vehicles AADT along the section of SR 149 between Lenburg Road and US 20.

Major intersections

See also
Indiana State Road 49
Indiana State Road 249

References

External links

 Indiana Highway Ends - SR 149

Northwest Indiana
149
Transportation in Porter County, Indiana